Charles F. (Rip) Smith Jr. (July 6, 1912 – August 1, 1962) was an American politician. He was a member of the Arkansas House of Representatives from 1949 to 1956. He was a member of the Democratic party. He drowned in a fishing accident in 1962.

References

1962 deaths
1912 births
Politicians from Hot Springs, Arkansas
20th-century American politicians
Deaths by drowning in the United States
Accidental deaths in Arkansas
Speakers of the Arkansas House of Representatives
Democratic Party members of the Arkansas House of Representatives